The St. Louis Whites were a minor league baseball team based in St. Louis, Missouri. In 1888, the St. Louis Whites played briefly as members of the Class A level Western Association. The Whites were created as an early version of a farm team for the St. Louis Browns, who evolved to become today's St. Louis Cardinals. The St. Louis Whites played home games at both Red Stocking Baseball Park and Sportsman's Park.

Baseball Hall of Fame member Jake Beckley played for the St. Louis Whites and Hall of Famer Charles Comiskey was a 25% owner of the team.

History

In 1888, the St. Louis Whites began minor league play as members of the eight–team Class A level Western Association. The Whites began 1888 play with the Chicago Maroons, Des Moines Prohibitionists, Kansas City Blues, Milwaukee Brewers, Minneapolis Millers, Omaha Omahogs and St. Paul Apostles joining St. Louis in Western Association play.

The "Whites" were founded by St. Louis Browns owner Chris Von der Ahe, who formed the St. Louis Whites as a farm team for the Browns. The new franchise joined the Class A level Western Association, the highest level of minor leagues in the era. Von der Ahe had signed no fewer than twenty–nine players to 1888 contracts for the Whites by December, 1887. Von der Ahe owned 50% of the franchise, with Whites' manager Tom Loftus and St. Louis Browns player/manager Charlie Comiskey splitting the remaining 50% of the St. Louis Whites ownership.

The newly formed St. Louis Whites played their first exhibition game against the St. Louis Browns on March 25, 1888, at Sportsman's Park.

The Whites opened the season, beginning league play on April 28, 1888, playing against the Milwaukee Brewers at Sportsman's Park. The St. Louis Whites played their first 11 games at home, while the St. Louis Browns were on the road. St. Louis later folded from the Western Association during the season, after the owners sought to sell the franchise. St. Louis disbanded on June 20, 1888, with a record of 10–18, playing under manager Tom Loftus. The roster of players was sold off or transferred to other teams. The St. Louis franchise was eventually replaced in the Western Association by the Sioux City Cornhuskers, who began play July 4, 1888, before folding on October 1, 1888.

Baseball Hall of Fame member Jake Beckley played for the 1888 St. Louis Whites. Playing for the team at age 20, Beckley batted.319 in 38 games for St, Louis, before making his major league debut after the Whites folded. Following the demise of the team, Beckley was purchased  for $4,500 (along with Harry Staley) by the Pittsburgh Alleghenys midway through the 1888 season.

The ballparks
The 1888 St. Louis Whites played their home games at Red Stocking Baseball Park. The ballpark was also called the Compton Avenue Base Ball Park and was torn down in 1898. The railroad runs through a portion of the site today. The ballpark was located at 701 S. Compton Avenue, St. Louis, Missouri.

The Whites were noted to have also played at Sportsman's Park, home of the St. Louis Browns. The ballpark was located at Grand Boulevard and Dodier Street, on the north side of St. Louis, later becoming home of the St. Louis Cardinals until 1966. The field portion of the ballpark is still in use today for youth activities.

Year–by–year record

Notable alumni

Baseball Hall of Fame alumni

Jake Beckley (1888), Inducted, 1971
Charles Comiskey (1888, part-owner) Inducted, 1939

Notable alumni
Tug Arundel (1888)
Ernie Burch (1888)
Bart Cantz (1888)
Jack Crooks (1888)
Tom Dolan (1888)
Pete Galligan (1888)
Joseph Herr (1888)
Hunkey Hines (1888)
Parson Nicholson (1888)
Harry Staley (1888)
Chris von der Ahe (1888, owner)

See also
 St. Louis Whites players

References

Defunct minor league baseball teams
Professional baseball teams in Missouri
Defunct baseball teams in Missouri
Baseball teams established in 1888
Baseball teams disestablished in 1888
Baseball teams in St. Louis
Defunct Western Association teams